The death poem is a genre of poetry that developed in the literary traditions of East Asian cultures—most prominently in Japan as well as certain periods of Chinese history and Joseon Korea. They tend to offer a reflection on death—both in general and concerning the imminent death of the author—that is often coupled with a meaningful observation on life. The practice of writing a death poem has its origins in Zen Buddhism. These poems became associated with the literate, spiritual, and ruling segments of society, as they were customarily composed by a poet, warrior, nobleman, or Buddhist monk.

The writing of a poem at the time of one's death and reflecting on the nature of death in an impermanent, transitory world is unique to East Asian culture. It has close ties with Buddhism, and particularly the mystical Zen Buddhism (of Japan), Chan Buddhism (of China) and Seon Buddhism (of Korea). From its inception, Buddhism has stressed the importance of death because awareness of death is what prompted the Buddha to perceive the ultimate futility of worldly concerns and pleasures. A death poem exemplifies both the "eternal loneliness" that is found at the heart of Zen and the search for a new viewpoint, a new way of looking at life and things generally, or a version of enlightenment (satori in Japanese; wu in Chinese). According to comparative religion scholar Julia Ching, Japanese Buddhism "is so closely associated with the memory of the dead and the ancestral cult that the family shrines dedicated to the ancestors, and still occupying a place of honor in homes, are popularly called the Butsudan, literally 'the Buddhist altars'. It has been the custom in modern Japan to have Shinto weddings, but to turn to Buddhism in times of bereavement and for funeral services".

The writing of a death poem was limited to the society's literate class, ruling class, samurai, and monks. It was introduced to Western audiences during World War II when Japanese soldiers, emboldened by their culture's samurai legacy, would write poems before suicidal missions or battles.

Japanese death poems

Style and technique
The poem's structure can be in one of many forms, including the two traditional forms in Japanese literature: kanshi or waka. Sometimes they are written in the three-line, seventeen-syllable haiku form, although the most common type of death poem (called a jisei ) is in the waka form called the tanka (also called a jisei-ei ) which consists of five lines totaling 31 syllables (5-7-5-7-7)—a form that constitutes over half of surviving death poems (Ogiu, 317–318).

Poetry has long been a core part of Japanese tradition. Death poems are typically graceful, natural, and emotionally neutral, in accordance with the teachings of Buddhism and Shinto. Excepting the earliest works of this tradition, it has been considered inappropriate to mention death explicitly; rather, metaphorical references such as sunsets, autumn or falling cherry blossom suggest the transience of life.

It was an ancient custom in Japan for literate persons to compose a jisei on their deathbed. One of the earliest was recited by Prince Ōtsu, executed in 686. More examples of jisei are those of the famous haiku poet Bashō, the Japanese Buddhist monk Ryōkan, Edo Castle builder Ōta Dōkan, the monk Gesshū Sōko, and the woodblock master Tsukioka Yoshitoshi. The custom has continued into modern Japan. Some people left their death poems in multiple forms: Prince Ōtsu made both waka and kanshi, and Sen no Rikyū made both kanshi and kyōka.

Fujiwara no Teishi, the first empress of Emperor Ichijo, was also known as a poet. Before her death in childbirth in 1001, she wrote three waka to express her sorrow and love to her servant, Sei Shōnagon, and the emperor. Teishi said that she would be entombed, rather than be cremated, so that she wrote that she will not become dust or cloud. The first one was selected into the poem collection Ogura Hyakunin Isshu.

On March 17, 1945, General Tadamichi Kuribayashi, the Japanese commander-in chief during the Battle of Iwo Jima, sent a final letter to Imperial Headquarters. In the message, General Kuribayashi apologized for failing to successfully defend Iwo Jima against the overwhelming forces of the United States military. At the same time, however, he expressed great pride in the heroism of his men, who, starving and thirsty, had been reduced to fighting with rifle butts and fists. He closed the message with three traditional death poems in waka form.

In 1970, writer Yukio Mishima and his disciple Masakatsu Morita composed death poems before their attempted coup at the Ichigaya garrison in Tokyo, where they committed seppuku. Mishima wrote:

Although he did not compose any formal death poem on his deathbed, the last poem written by Bashō (1644–1694), recorded by his disciple Takarai Kikaku during his final illness, is generally accepted as his poem of farewell:

Despite the seriousness of the subject matter, some Japanese poets have employed levity or irony in their final compositions. The Zen monk Tokō (杜口; 1710–1795) commented on the pretentiousness of some jisei in his own death poem:

This poem by Moriya Sen'an (d. 1838) showed an expectation of an entertaining afterlife:

The final line, "hopefully the cask will leak" (mori ya sen nan), is a play on the poet's name, Moriya Sen'an.

Written over a large calligraphic character 死 shi, meaning Death, the Japanese Zen master Hakuin Ekaku (白隠 慧鶴; 1685–1768) wrote as his jisei:

Korean death poems
Besides Korean Buddhist monks, Confucian scholars called seonbis sometimes wrote death poems. However, better-known examples are those written or recited by famous historical figures facing death when they were executed for loyalty to their former king or due to insidious plot.  They are therefore impromptu verses, often declaring their loyalty or steadfastness.  The following are some examples that are still learned by school children in Korea as models of loyalty.  These examples are written in Korean sijo (three lines of 3-4-3-4 or its variation) or in Hanja five-syllable format (5-5-5-5 for a total of 20 syllables) of ancient Chinese poetry (五言詩).

Yi Gae 
Yi Gae (이개; 1417–1456) was one of "six martyred ministers" who were executed for conspiring to assassinate King Sejo, who usurped the throne from his nephew Danjong. Sejo offered to pardon six ministers including Yi Gae and Seong Sam-mun if they would repent their crime and accept his legitimacy, but Yi Gae and all others refused.  He recited the following poem in his cell before execution on June 8, 1456. In the following sijo, "Lord" actually should read someone beloved or cherished, meaning King Danjong in this instance.

Seong Sam-mun
Like Yi Gae, Seong Sam-mun (성삼문, 1418–1456) was one of "six martyred ministers", and was the leader of the conspiracy to assassinate Sejo. He refused the offer of pardon and denied Sejo's legitimacy. He recited the following sijo in prison and the second one (five-syllable poem) on his way to the place of execution, where his limbs were tied to oxen and torn apart.

Jo Gwang-jo
Jo Gwang-jo (조광조; 1482–1519) was a neo-Confucian reformer who was framed by the conservative faction opposing his reforms in the Third Literati Purge of 1519. His political enemies slandered Jo to be disloyal by writing "Jo will become the king" with honey on leaves so that caterpillars left behind the same phrase as if in supernatural manifestation. King Jungjong ordered his death by sending poison and abandoned Jo's reform measures. Jo, who had believed to the end that Jungjong would see his errors, wrote the following before drinking poison on December 20, 1519. Repetition of similar looking words is used to emphasize strong conviction in this five-syllable poem.

Jeong Mong-ju
Jeong Mong-ju (정몽주; 1337–1392) was an influential high minister of the Goryeo dynasty when Yi Seong-gye overthrew it to establish the Joseon dynasty. When Prince Jeongan asked Jeong to support the new dynasty through a poem, Jeong answered with a poem of his own reaffirming his loyalty to the falling Goryeo dynasty. Just as he suspected, he was assassinated the same night on April 4, 1392. The Goryeo dynasty symbolically ended with Jeong's death and his death poem is the most famous in Korean history.

Chinese death poems

Yuan Chonghuan 
Yuan Chonghuan (1584–1630) was a politician and military general who served under the Ming dynasty. He is best known for defending Liaodong from Jurchen invaders during the Later Jin invasion of the Ming. Yuan met his end when he was arrested and executed by lingchi ("slow slicing") on the order of the Chongzhen Emperor under false charges of treason, which were believed to have been planted against him by the Jurchens. Before his execution, he produced the following poem.

Zheng Ting 
Zheng Ting (died 621) was a politician in the end of Sui Dynasty. He was executed by Wang Shichong after trying to resign from his official position under Wang and become a Buddhist monk. He faced the execution without fear and wrote this death poem, which reflected his strong Buddhism belief.

See also
 Elegy
 Epitaph
 Lament
 Last words
 Mi último adiós
 Ryōkan
 Suicide note
 Xie Lingyun
Yuan Chonghuan
Chinese Chán
 Japanese Zen
 Mono no aware
 Wabi-sabi

Notes

References

Further reading
 Blackman, Sushila (1997). Graceful Exits: How Great Beings Die: Death Stories of Tibetan, Hindu & Zen Masters. Weatherhill, Inc.: USA, New York, New York. 
 Hoffmann, Yoel (1986). Japanese Death Poems: Written by Zen Monks and Haiku Poets on the Verge of Death. Charles E. Tuttle Company: USA, Rutland, Vermont.

External links
  Mishima's Death Poem

Genres of poetry
Death customs
Japanese poetry
Poem
 
Poems about death
Buddhism and death